Camille Schmutz (born ) was a French female artistic gymnast, representing her nation at international competitions.

She participated at the 2004 Summer Olympics.

References

External links
https://www.youtube.com/watch?v=IjxGj0_ZHu0
Camille Schmutz at Sports Reference
http://www.gettyimages.com/photos/camille-schmutz?excludenudity=true&sort=mostpopular&mediatype=photography&phrase=camille%20schmutz&family=editorial

1988 births
Living people
French female artistic gymnasts
Gymnasts from Paris
Gymnasts at the 2004 Summer Olympics
Olympic gymnasts of France
21st-century French women